The Massachusetts Department of Public Utilities is one of two Public Utilities Commissions of the Commonwealth of Massachusetts, in the Executive Office of Energy and Environmental Affairs.  There are currently three members of the commission.  Its major duties include the regulation of public utility companies that distribute electric power, natural gas and water to the citizens of Massachusetts. Current commissioners as of 2011 are Ann G. Berwick, chair, Jolette A. Westbrook, and David W. Cash.  DPU also has some transportation oversight duties not handled by the Massachusetts Department of Transportation.

Besides DPU a second department is the Massachusetts Department of Telecommunications and Cable, whose duties include the regulation of public utility companies that distribute satellite & cable television (licenses), broadband, and telecommunications services.

References

External links 

 Dept. of Telecommunications and Cable

Department of Public Utilities, Massachusetts
Massachusetts
Government agencies established in 1861
1861 establishments in Massachusetts